Yusuf Öztürk (born 8 February 1979) is a Turkish former professional footballer who played as a midfielder for FC Copenhagen in the Danish Superliga during 1999–2000 season, the Fremad Amager in Danish First Division during the 2005–06 season, and Ølstykke FC during the 2008–09 season. He also had stints in the lower tiers for AB 70 and Skjold Birkerød.

References

1979 births
Living people
Turkish footballers
Turkish expatriate footballers
Association football midfielders
F.C. Copenhagen players
Fremad Amager players
Ølstykke FC players
AB Tårnby players
IF Skjold Birkerød players
Kjøbenhavns Boldklub players
FC Helsingør players
Danish Superliga players
Danish 1st Division players
Danish 2nd Division players